San Carlo is the Italian for Saint Charles and may refer to:

 San Carlo (company), an Italian manufacturer of snack foods
 San Carlo, Graubünden, a village in the municipality of Poschiavo, canton of Graubünden, Switzerland
 San Carlo, San Vincenzo, a small village in the province of Livorno, Italy
 Teatro di San Carlo, an opera house in Naples, Italy

See also
 Charles Borromeo or San Carlo Borromeo
 Saint Charles (disambiguation)
 San Carlo ai Catinari, an early-Baroque-style church building in Rome
 San Carlo al Corso, a basilica church in Rome
 San Carlo al Corso (Milan), a church in Milan
 San Carlo all'Arena, a neighbourhood in Naples where the Bourbon Hospice for the Poor is located
 San Carlo alle Quattro Fontane, a church in Rome
 San Carlo Canavese, a municipality in the province of Turin in Piedmont, Italy